Fisher's principle is an evolutionary model that explains why the sex ratio of most species that produce offspring through sexual reproduction is approximately 1:1 between males and females. A. W. F. Edwards has remarked that it is "probably the most celebrated argument in evolutionary biology".

Fisher's principle was outlined by Ronald Fisher in his 1930 book The Genetical Theory of Natural Selection (but has been incorrectly attributed as original to Fisher). Fisher couched his argument in terms of parental expenditure, and predicted that parental expenditure on both sexes should be equal. Sex ratios that are 1:1 are hence known as "", and those that are not 1:1 are "" or "" and occur because they break the assumptions made in Fisher's model.

Basic explanation
W. D. Hamilton gave the following simple explanation in his 1967 paper on "Extraordinary sex ratios", given the condition that males and females cost equal amounts to produce:

 Suppose male births are less common than female.
 A newborn male then has better mating prospects than a newborn female, and therefore can expect to have more offspring.
 Therefore parents genetically disposed to produce males tend to have more than average numbers of grandchildren born to them.
 Therefore the genes for male-producing tendencies spread, and male births become more common.
 As the 1:1 sex ratio is approached, the advantage associated with producing males dies away.
 The same reasoning holds if females are substituted for males throughout. Therefore 1:1 is the equilibrium ratio.

In modern language, the 1:1 ratio is the evolutionarily stable strategy (ESS).

Parental investment

Fisher wrote the explanation described by Eric Charnov and James J. Bull as being "characteristically terse" and "cryptic": in Chapter 6: "Sexual Reproduction and Sexual Selection":

Development of the argument
Fisher's principle is an early example of a model in which genes for greater production of either sex become equalized in the population, because each sex supplies exactly half the genes of all future generations.

Fisher's principle is rooted in the concept of frequency-dependent selection, though Fisher's principle is not frequency-dependent selection per se. Frequency-dependent selection, in this scenario, is the logic that the probability of an individual being able to breed is dependent on the frequency of the opposite sex in relation to its own sex. It was first described by Darwin in 1871.

Fisher's principle extends frequency dependence to explain how natural selection can act on genes that affect the frequency of an individual's grandchildren without affecting the frequency of their children. Fisher predicted that parents will invest their resources equally between each sex of offspring, because each sex supplies exactly half the genes of all future generations. As a result, those genes that cause parents to invest unequally in the sexes will tend to be selected against. Fisher was aware that in humans, more boys are born, but boys are also more likely to die in infancy. As a consequence, he reasoned that because parents tend to invest less in boys because more boys die before the end of the period of parental care there is a higher rate of male births to equalise parental investment in each sex.

Fisher's principle is also a precursor to evolutionary game theory.  R.H. MacArthur (1965) first suggested applying to sex ratios the language of game theory, and this was subsequently picked up by W.D. Hamilton (1967) who termed the equilibrium point the "unbeatable strategy". Hamilton's unbeatable strategy was refined by John Maynard Smith and George R. Price (1973) into their concept of the evolutionarily stable strategy, i.e. one which cannot be invaded by a mutant strategy.

Fisher's concept of parental expenditure (now termed parental investment), developed particularly by Robert Trivers, is now an important concept in ecology.

Psychiatrist Randolph M. Nesse has argued that Fisher's principle illustrates the dominance of individual-level selection over group selection because, regardless of the hypothetical sex imbalance of a group, the genes of a parental organism produce offspring of the less frequent sex in order to maximize their transmission to subsequent generations but at substantial cost to the group growth rate.

Fisher's sources
Historical research by A.W.F. Edwards has shown that, although the idea has been attributed to Fisher, Charles Darwin had originally formulated a similar argument in the first edition of The Descent of Man but removed it for the second edition – Fisher only had a copy of the second edition – and quotes Darwin in The Genetical Theory of Natural Selection.

Carl Düsing of the University of Jena published a similar argument in three works between 1883–1884, which is essentially identical to Shaw and Mohler's later model. It has been argued that Darwin's argument and Fisher's are different, in that Darwin assumes monogamy whereas Fisher's does not; the same author contends that Fisher's argument is very much like Dusing's, except that Fisher introduced the idea of parental investment and calculated the sex ratio that should exist at the age of independence, which may precede the age of reproduction.

References

Further reading
As the most celebrated argument in evolutionary biology, (Edwards, 1998, pp. 564–569) Fisher's principle is a staple of popular science books on evolution. For example, see:

 

 

For those wishing more advanced treatment, see
 

Evolutionary biology
Sex ratio
Evolutionary game theory
1930 introductions